The People's Action Party (PAP) was a political party in Ghana during the Second Republic (1969-1972). In elections held on 29 August 1969, the PAP won 2 out of 140 seats in the National Assembly. The party's leader was Imoru Ayarna.

References

Defunct political parties in Ghana